The Southern Cross 35, also called the Gillmer 35, is  an American sailboat that was designed by Thomas C. Gillmer as a cruiser and first built in 1978.

Production
The design was built by C. E. Ryder in Bristol, Rhode Island, United States. The company built 95 examples of the design starting in 1978, but it is now out of production.

Design
The Southern Cross 35 is a recreational keelboat, built predominantly of fiberglass with an Airtex core in the hull and a balsa core for the deck, and also with wooden trim. It has a cutter rig, a raked stem, a canoe style transom, a skeg-mounted rudder controlled by a wheel and a fixed raked fin keel with a cutaway forefoot. It displaces  and carries  of lead ballast.

The below deck accommodation includes a bow "V"-berth and a double settee berth to port in the main cabin. Then main cabin drop-leaf table mounts to the mast. The main cabin has a teak grate sole and teak and white oak woodwork. The head is forward on the port side and includes a shower, with a fiberglass pan floor and a teak grate. There is a wet locker and navigation station opposite the head.

Ventilation includes an opening hatch above the galley, plus an opening galley port. The main cabin has an opening hatch and eight opening ports.

The boat was factory supplied with a complete suite of sails, including several genoas, jibs, storm jibs and jib-topsails. The staysail is boom-mounted and self-tending. There is an anchor well on the bow and an anchor rode locker.

The mainsheet traveler is cockpit mounted, just forward of the helm position for easy access while sailing. There are halyard winches on the cabin roof and two genoa winches on the curved cockpit coaming. The genoa sheets route through a track that allows close sheeting of the sail. The mainsail has jiffy reefing and has a topping lift supplied. The standing rigging is of steel rod construction.

The design has a PHRF racing average handicap of 174.

Operational history
Rodney Glover, writing for Cruising World in 2008, described the design, "the Southern Cross 35 was the last of the series. It's a canoe-stern cutter with a traditional look but with a modern underbody featuring a shallow fin keel and a skeg-hung rudder ... While not a racer, the SC 35 will keep up with most boats in its size range, and it will pass quite a few. It's a sweet boat offshore. It's always easy to control, even in high winds and huge seas, and despite its relatively low freeboard, the boat is very dry."

A 2015 review by R. Boothby for Blue Water Boats described the boat, "the Southern Cross 35 is wide-beamed and graced with a sweeping sheerline that keeps her exceptionally dry in a rough seaway. At the same time, a relatively high-aspect rig along with a fin keel and skeg-mounted rudder allow her to combine impressive sea-worthiness with surprisingly lively performance."

See also
List of sailing boat types

Related development
Southern Cross 28

Similar sailboats
C&C 34/36
C&C 35
Express 35
Goderich 35
Hughes 36
Hughes-Columbia 36
Hunter 35 Legend
Hunter 35.5 Legend
Island Packet 35
Landfall 35
Mirage 35
Pilot 35

References

Keelboats
1970s sailboat type designs
Sailing yachts
Sailboat type designs by Thomas C. Gillmer
Sailboat types built by C. E. Ryder